Spanakopita (from  spanáki 'spinach', and πίτα píta 'pie') is a Greek savory spinach pie. It often also contains cheese, typically feta, and may then be called spanakotiropita ( "spinach-cheese pie"), especially in northern Greece. In southern Greece, the term spanakopita is also common for the versions with cheese. A version without cheese and eggs is eaten during religious fasts throughout Greece.

Ingredients and variations

The traditional filling comprises chopped spinach, feta cheese, onions or scallions, egg, and seasoning. Other white, preferably salted cheeses such as kefalotiri may also be mixed with the feta cheese, and some may be used as a substitute for feta cheese. Herbs such as dill, mint and parsley may be used as flavouring. The filling is wrapped or layered in phyllo (filo) pastry with butter or olive oil, either in a large pan from which individual servings are cut, or rolled into individual triangular servings.  While the filo-dough recipe is most common, some recipes use a village-style pastry horiatiko, which has a thicker crust. It can also be made with puff pastry. The pastry is golden in colour when baked, the colour often enhanced by butter and egg yolk. It can be served straight from the oven or at room temperature.

There is a "fasting"  (νηστίσιμη nistisimi), or vegan, version of spanakopita, eaten during Lent and other religious fasts. This version has spinach, onions or green onions, other green herbs like dill, parsley, or celery as filling and uses olive oil and a little wheat flour but no eggs or dairy products.  The mixture is oven-baked until crisp. Non-traditional vegan versions are available that typically use tofu instead of cheese.

In rural Greece, smaller amounts of spinach are used, with the missing amount replaced with leeks, chard and sorrel.

Related pastries
Spanakopita appears in many traditional Greek cookery books and appears in numerous restaurants and hotel menus throughout Greece and internationally. The pastry is similar to torta pasqualina, a traditional dish from Italy's Liguria region, that is very common in Argentina and Uruguay, and to pita zeljanica (sometimes considered a kind of burek) popular in Serbia and Bosnia. It is also a common dish in Gibraltar where cheddar or edam may replace the feta.

See also

Burek
Rustico (pastry)
Gibanica
Tiropita, a traditional Greek pie made with cheese 
Bougatsa
List of Greek dishes
List of pies, tarts and flans
List of snack foods

References

Greek pastries
Savoury pies
Snack foods
Spinach dishes
Lenten foods

bg:Баница